Boz Rud, also rendered as Buzrud, may refer to:
 Eslamabad-e Bezahrud
 Qaleh-ye Bozeh Rud